Brady Corporation is an American developer, and manufacturer of specialty products, technical equipment, and services for identifying components used in workplaces. Headquartered in Milwaukee, Wisconsin, Brady employs 6,600 people in North and South America, Europe, Asia, and Australia and serves customers and markets globally. 
Brady Corporation was founded as W.H. Brady Co. in Eau Claire, Wis., in 1914, by William H. Brady. 
In 1984, the company went public and began trading on the NASDAQ market. In 1998, W.H. Brady Co. became Brady Corporation and in 1999, the company began trading on the New York Stock Exchange under the ticker symbol BRC. Brady serves a multitude of businesses across the globe in various sectors having more than 1 million customers with fiscal net sales for 2013/14 of $1.225 billion.

Products 
The company's main product lines are in safety identification, regulatory compliance, brand protection, laboratory identification and specimen tracking,  visitor access,  voice and data communications and precision die-cut components. They include do-it-yourself printing systems, labeling materials, signs and software, and lockout/tagout, spill control and regulatory compliance devices.  Brady sells through distribution channels and e-commerce websites like bradyid.com.

As a specialty business-to-business manufacturer, the company's products are rarely obvious to the general public, being mainly used inside manufacturing facilities, public buildings, computers, airplanes, and mobile phones. Prominent usages include:

 Brady markers identified every pipe in the Manhattan Project's  weapons plant in the 1940s.
 Brady has supplied helmet logos for a number of NFL teams including the Green Bay Packers.
 Brady Contract Services used on North Slope during construction of the Alaska gas pipeline.
 Brady SPC sorbent products helped clean up the Deepwater Horizon oil spill. More than 500,000 feet of oil booms, thousands of nets, 600 bales of absorbent pads, and more than a million feet of other materials absorbed spilled oil from the water.

History 
Brady's first products were promotional calendars, painted signs and point of purchase displays. The company survived the Great Depression by producing hundreds of millions of push cards: small paperboard cards with rows of perforated circles concealing numbers, which fitted into Brady's established business of printing, die cutting and laminating.

1940s—During World War II, Brady developed the wire marker card - numbered cloth strips on an adhesive card. These strips could be used by electricians and assembly workers by wrapping them around electrical wires, creating a numbering system to identify components.

1950s & 1960s—Brady moved to Milwaukee, in an era of sustained growth. Brady became known as a specialist in identification materials, improving its existing products and developing new ones. In addition to new products, the company developed proprietary machines that could laminate, die cut, print and cut to length in a single operation, boosting production volumes and reducing costs.

1970s—Having sold their products through distribution and mail order since 1947, the company in 1970s established subsidiaries in England, Belgium, Germany, France and Australia. By 1980, international subsidiaries accounted for 20 percent of sales.

1980s—In 1981, Brady acquired Seton, a direct marketing business that sold nearly identical products. Seton's catalog mailings rose from 1 million in 1981 to 8 million in 1988 and in 1985. Subsidiaries were established in England, Canada and Germany by 1988.

1990s—Product lines evolved with developments in technology. The company introduced printing systems enabling customers to print their own safety signs, labels and identification products on-site. Software, along with printers, scanners and bar code labels introduced automatic identification and data collection. New high-performance materials were developed for circuit board manufacturing, and mobile phones opened a new market for the company's die-cut products.

2000s—Was a period of growth through acquisition. More than 35 acquisitions led to a tripling in size between 2003 and 2010.

Sustainability

The Brady Corporation says it takes a comprehensive approach to the sustainability of the company, its customers and the communities in which it operates. In 2012, it issued its first annual sustainability report.

The company says its operations focuses on reducing waste, conserving energy, using natural resources responsibly and promoting employee safety. For example, in 2010 Brady became a Smartway Transport partner in the U.S. while in 2009 it opened a facility in Egelsbach, Germany, that uses a geothermic heating and cooling system. It says it uses Design for Environment principles to design eco-friendly products including halogen-free flame-retardant labels and ribbons.

In its communities, it operates through strategic philanthropy and employee engagement. Charitable giving through the Brady Corporation Foundation and Brady Corporation has increased 10-fold over the past five years and gift-in-kind donations have surpassed $1 million. Recent projects include a third China Hope School in Sichuan Province; "Brady Corporation, Jr.," an interactive exhibit that teaches preschoolers about manufacturing at the Betty Brinn Children's Museum in Milwaukee; and funding college educations through I Have a Dream for a class of students at Clarke Street Elementary School.

International Expansion 
1947: Brady began selling its products internationally, to South Africa.

1950s: First European sales office in U.K., and operations in Canada.

1960s & 1970s: Expansion throughout Europe with operations in Belgium, Germany, France and Sweden.

1980s: Entered Asia, Australia, Hong Kong, Japan and Singapore.

1990s: Began operating in Mexico, Italy, and Brazil with further expansion in Asia to China, Malaysia, Philippines, South Korea, and Taiwan.

2000s (decade): Continued expansion in Asia, Thailand and India as well as expansion into Slovakia in Eastern Europe; Turkey in the Middle East and the United Arab Emirates.

Brady brands 
As a result of acquisitions Brady products are traded under a variety of names and brands, including IDenticard, Seton, Electromark, PDC, Safetyshop, Emedco, JAM, Scafftag DAWG, Clement Communications  & Personnel Concepts Compliance, BIG Badges, ID Warehouse, Securimed, Signals, Stickolor, Precision Dynamics Corporation, Accidental Health & Safety, Safety Signs & Service, Trafalgar Australia, Carroll, QuikCrimp, SPC, Transposafe.

References

External links 
 
 Bradycorp.com
 Brady Direct Marketing Inc.

Companies listed on the New York Stock Exchange
Manufacturing companies based in Milwaukee